Earl W. Rowe (born ) is a former politician in Ontario, Canada. He served in the Legislative Assembly of Ontario from 1985 to 1987, as a member of the Progressive Conservative Party of Ontario.

Background
Prior to his entry into politics, Rowe was the manager of the Barrie Raceway. He is the grandson of former Lieutenant Governor of Ontario William Earl Rowe.

Politics
Rowe was elected to the Ontario legislature in the 1985 provincial election, defeating Liberal Party candidate Ross Whiteside by 534 votes in Simcoe Centre.  The Progressive Conservatives won a tenuous minority government in this election, and were soon defeated in the legislature by a motion of non-confidence.  After this, Rowe served as an opposition member for two years.

He was defeated in the 1987 provincial election, losing to Liberal Bruce Owen by 2,492 votes.

References

External links
 

1951 births
Living people
Progressive Conservative Party of Ontario MPPs